Double Take is an album by trumpeters Freddie Hubbard and Woody Shaw recorded in November 1985 and released on the Blue Note label. It features performances by Hubbard, Cecil McBee, Carl Allen, Mulgrew Miller and Kenny Garrett. The album was Hubbard's first for Blue Note since recording The Night of the Cookers (1965) twenty years previously.

Reception
The Allmusic review by Scott Yanow states "Hubbard still gets the edge (his range is wider and he cannot be surpassed technically). Although Shaw tended to play more harmonically sophisticated lines and is remarkably inventive, they are both trumpet masters". The album was followed by a second Hubbard/Shaw collaboration The Eternal Triangle in 1987 and the two volumes were combined for the double CD release The Complete Freddie Hubbard and Woody Shaw Sessions (1995).

The album debuted on the Billboard Top Jazz Album chart on July 5, 1986 and would spend 12 weeks on the chart, eventually peaking at #19.

Track listing
 "Sandu" (Clifford Brown) - 4:28    
 "Boperation" (Howard McGhee, Fats Navarro) - 4:56   
 "Lament for Booker" (Freddie Hubbard, J. J. Johnson) - 6:22   
 "Hub-Tones" (Hubbard) - 6:25
 "Desert Moonlight" (Lee Morgan) - 8:10   
 "Just a Ballad for Woody" (Woody Shaw) - 5:30   
 "Lotus Blossom" (Kenny Dorham) - 8:15

Personnel
Freddie Hubbard - trumpet, flugelhorn
Woody Shaw - trumpet
Kenny Garrett - alto saxophone, flute
Mulgrew Miller - piano
Cecil McBee - bass 
Carl Allen - drums

References

1985 albums
Freddie Hubbard albums
Woody Shaw albums
Blue Note Records albums
Albums produced by Michael Cuscuna
Albums recorded at Van Gelder Studio